Hinzenbach is a municipality in the district of Eferding in the Austrian state of Upper Austria.

Geography
Hinzenbach lies in the Hausruckviertel. About 10 percent of the municipality is forest and 77 percent farmland.

Sports 
In Hinzenbach are ski jumping hills called Aigner-Schanzen.

References

External links

Cities and towns in Eferding District